Ihor Brusylo (born 1980) is a Ukrainian politician and diplomat. Deputy Head of the Office of the President of Ukraine.

Early life 

Ihor Brusylo was born in 1980.

He graduated with honors from the Taras Shevchenko National University of Kyiv for the specialty “Translation” and the Ukrainian State University of Finance and International Trade for the specialty “International Law”.

Career 

From 2002 to 2005, he worked in the Administration of the President of Ukraine.

In 2005–2007, Ihor Brusylo worked in the Apparatus of the Verkhovna Rada of Ukraine.

From 2007 to 2011 — in the diplomatic service at the Embassy of Ukraine in the Italian Republic.

In 2011–2012, he worked in the Apparatus of the Verkhovna Rada of Ukraine.

From 2012 to 2021, he was the chief consultant, head of the department, deputy head of the department, first deputy head of the service, head of the State Protocol and Ceremonials of Ukraine of the Office of the President of Ukraine.

By decree of the President of Ukraine on March 17, 2021, he was appointed Deputy Head of the Office of the President of Ukraine.

Personal life 

He is married. Wife — Iryna Valeriivna Brusylo.  Daughter — Daryna Igorivna Brusylo.

References 

Living people
1980 births
Ukrainian politicians
Ukrainian diplomats